Christie Downs railway station is located on the Seaford line. Situated in the southern Adelaide suburb of Christie Downs, it is 28.9 kilometres from Adelaide station.

History
The original Christie Downs station opened on 25 January 1976 when the line was extended from Hallett Cove Beach station. At the same time a new timetable was introduced which had trains stopping at all stations to Brighton, backed up by semi-fast trains that continued to Christie Downs. It was approximately 29.7 kilometres from Adelaide station and consisted of a platform adjacent to what is now the Adelaide bound track. In April 1978 the line was extended to Noarlunga Centre.

The current Christie Downs station opened in November 1981, with the original Christie Downs station closed and later demolished (although the footpath leading to it can still be seen). A $500,000 upgrade proposal, including levelling the ramp, installing new lighting and a bike cage, and painting artworks to deter graffiti, is due to be completed by the end of 2017.

Services by platform

References

External links

Flick gallery

Railway stations in Adelaide
Railway stations in Australia opened in 1976
Railway stations in Australia opened in 1981